Isa Lake is located in Yellowstone National Park, in the U.S. state of Wyoming. The lake straddles the continental divide at Craig Pass. Indigenous peoples have lived in the Yellowstone region for at least 11,000 years. In the 1800s, at the time of the first European exploration of the area, the region was home to several Indigenous Nations including the Nimíipuu, Absaroke, and Shoshone Nations. Hiram M. Chittenden became the first known European to sight the lake in 1891, while searching for the best routes connecting Old Faithful and the West Thumb Geyser Basin. Chittenden named the lake after Miss Isabel Jelke, from Cincinnati, though it is not clear why.

Isa Lake is believed to be one of the few natural lakes in the world which drain to two different oceans, another being Wollaston Lake. (For similar cases see List of unusual drainage systems.) The east side of the lake drains by way of the Lewis River to the Pacific Ocean and the west side of the lake drains by way of the Firehole River to the Gulf of Mexico.

The lake is easy to visit as it is adjacent to the road that now connects the Old Faithful and West Thumb geysers basins, on what is known as the "lower loop" of the figure-eight roadway which traverses through Yellowstone. The great yellow pond-lily thrives in the lake.

Notes

Lakes of Teton County, Wyoming
Lakes of Wyoming
Lakes of Yellowstone National Park
Great Divide of North America
Bifurcation lakes